UPR Info is a non-governmental organisation (NGO) headquartered in Switzerland. The organisation main goal is to raise awareness and provide see capacity-building tools to the different actors of the Universal Periodic Review (UPR) process, such as United Nations Member States, NGOs, National Human Rights Institutions (NHRI) and civil society actors. It was established in 2008.

UPR Info organises "Pre-sessions" before actual UPRs. Over the years, the project Aupports civil society organisations taking part in the human rights advocacy platform. UPR Info has released publications about the implementation of the Universal Periodic Review recommendation, such as in 2014, "Beyond promises: the impact of the UPR on the ground", and in 2016 "The Butterfly effect: spreading good practices of UPR Implementation", widely praised by NGOs, States and institutions.

The material produced by the organisation, in particular its database that includes over 55,000 UPR recommendations, has been used by several scholars to document the UPR mechanism.

UPR Info launched in 2016, together with CCPR Centre, DOCIP, Huridocs, and Save the Children, an initiative called "We Pay Our Interns" to promote a basic stipend for internships in Geneva.

Founders 
UPR Info was founded in 2008 by Roland Chauville. He was joined by Jean-Claude Vignoli at the initial stage of the organisation.

The current executive director is Mona M'Bikay since September 2017.

Awards 
On 27 March 2019, the organisation was awarded the prize for Democracy and Human Rights (Démocratie et les Droits de l’Homme) by the Parliament of the Federation of Wallonie-Bruxelles

Board 
From 2011 to 2015, Bertrand Ramcharan was UPR Info's first elected president. From 2015 to 2022, Miloon Kothari was UPR Info's president.
Since 2023, Catherine Mbengue fulfils this role.

The board in 2023 comprises Prof. Edward R. McMahon, Ms. Hoa Nghiem, and Mr. Patrick Wall.

Publications 
 The Civil Society Compendium: A guide for Civil Society Organisations engaging in the Universal Periodic Review, in English, French, and Spanish, April 2017
 UPR Info Pre-sessions: Empowering human rights voices from the ground, December 2016
 The Butterfly Effect, Spreading Good Practices of UPR Implementation, November 2016
 A Guide for Recommending States at the UPR, September 2015
 Starting all over again? An analysis of the links between the 1st and 2nd UPR cycle, January 2015
 Beyond Promises – the impact of the UPR on the ground, October 2014
 On the road to implementation, October 2012
 Analytical Assessment of the UPR 2008–2010, October 2010

References

External links
 Official UPR Info website 
 Tutorials on the UPR 
 Official UPR Info Facebook page
 Official UPR Info Twitter page

International human rights organizations
Organizations established in 2008
Non-profit organisations based in Switzerland
Organisations based in Switzerland